All That Breathes is a 2022 documentary film directed by Shaunak Sen. It is produced by Shaunak Sen, Aman Mann  and Teddy Leifer under the banner of Rise Films. The film follows siblings Mohammad Saud and Nadeem Shehzad, who rescue and treat injured birds in India.

The film had its world premiere at the 2022 Sundance Film Festival on January 22, 2022, where it won Grand Jury Prize in World Cinema Documentary Competition. It also had a screening at Cannes Film Festival in the special screening section, where it won the Golden Eye. It was later nominated for the Academy Award for Best Documentary Feature Film.

Synopsis

Two brothers Saud and Nadeem were raised in New Delhi, looking at a sky speckled with black kites, watching as relatives tossed meat up to these birds of prey. Muslim belief held that feeding the kites would expel troubles. Now, birds are falling from the polluted, opaque skies of New Delhi and the two brothers have made it their life’s work to care for the injured black kites.

Production
The documentary is the story of Nadeem Shehzad and Mohammad Saud, the two brothers who run a bird clinic in Wazirabad, Delhi where 20,000 raptors have been cured over the last 20 years. Impressed with their dedication and the spirit, Shaunak Sen, the director decided to film them. As he said, “I am drawn by the subject of the interconnectedness of an ecosystem — one that humans are a part of, not apart from. How man, animals share space and become part of the whole. It is a valuable story.”

Release
The film had its world premiere at the 2022 Sundance Film Festival on January 22, 2022. It was also selected for screening at 2022 Cannes Film Festival in 'Special Screenings' section and was screened on 23 May.

The film was released in the United States in fall 2022, along with festival screenings, by Submarine Deluxe, in association with Sideshow. 

The film was selected for Documentary Competition in the 46th Hong Kong International Film Festival, where it was screened on 24 August 2022 and won Firebird Award. In September 2022, it was invited to the 18th Zurich Film Festival held from 22 September to 2 October, where it was nominated in documentary competition section. In the same month, it was also selected in main slate of 2022 New York Film Festival held from September 30 to October 16, 2022. It also made it to 'Wide Angle - Documentary Showcase' section of 27th Busan International Film Festival and was screened on 9 October 2022. Next it was selected at BFI London Film Festival held from 5 October to 16 October 2022, where it won The Grierson Award in the Documentary Competition.

Home media
HBO Documentary Films bought the worldwide television rights for the film and following its theatrical run in the United States it became available on HBO and streaming service HBO Max on February 7, 2023.

Reception
 

Daniel Fienberg of The Hollywood Reporter, reviewing the film wrote, "Sen has encapsulated a vision of New Delhi in which modern life, particularly pollution and overpopulation, have placed new strain on the balance between humans and nature." Praising the film he further stated that the film "is one of the more dreamily provocative documentaries I’ve ever seen." Fienberg concluding his review remarked, "In this tiny marvel of a documentary, it’s a little and a lot all at once". 
Dennis Harvey reviewing for Variety praised the score of the film, writing, "The meditative yet ingratiating impact is furthered by Roger Goula’s score, which strikes aptly spectral notes." He also appreciated the cinematography and wrote, "There’s an inventive lyricism to the imagery here, aesthetically unified despite three credited cinematographers." Concluding his review Harvey stated, "With a tone more melancholic and charming than one might expect given the various crises at play here, Sen's deceptively casual observational documentary prefers dwelling on resistance and resilience to pronouncements of doom." Josh Flanders and Sheri Flanders of Chicago Reader termed the film, "A soaring visual masterpiece." David Ehrlich of IndieWire graded the film with B+ and praised the framework comparing it with Janusz Kamiński. Ehrlich appreciating the score, sound recording and camerawork wrote, "Roger Goula’s orgiastic synth score (a little Philip Glass, a lot of Dan Deacon) and Niladri Shekhar Roy and Moinak Bose’s visceral sound recording (brace for an entire chorus of rats) complement the micro-attention of the camerawork by hearing a tumult of life in even the most unassuming frame." He concluded, "There is so much life in All That Breathes that you won't be left clamoring for more personality."

Poulomi Das reviewing for Firstpost opined, "Simply as a record of slow-burning ecological tragedy, Sen crafts All That Breathes like a meditative poem, one that is cut to mindful perfection by editors Charlotte Munch Bengtsen and Vedant Joshi. The structure itself is striking in its unadorned approach. There’s poetry in simplicity to be found here.." She also appreciated the  cinematography of Ben Bernhard, Riju Das, and Saumyananda Sahi. Das stated, "Sen masterfully reveals the underbelly of the capital, seamlessly merging foreground and background, nature and atmosphere, and the seen and the under-seen. She concluded, "It’s not everyday that you get to see a narrative so attuned to the craft of filmmaking and the beauty of emotion that it results in a hypnotic viewing experience." Tomris Laffly of Harper's Bazaar reviewing the film opined, "Humanity comes in its most selfless in All That Breathes, [which adopts] the interconnectedness of nature and mankind as a guiding principle." Laffly stated Sen unearths something poetic in the [narrative], celebrating slivers of against-the-odds hope in generous sums. Alissa Wilkinson reviewing the film for Vox stated, " Shaunak Sen’s lyrical portrait of two men who work to save injured and sick birds in the city. Their quest to find resources for their perpetually underfunded operation winds together with meditations on the nature of the birds, particularly kites, birds of prey that have been forced to adapt to the changing city." Wilkinson in conclusion opined that the work two protagonists are doing is a "metaphor for the huge task that bringing healing to the city’s human residents might be, too." Since "we all breathe the same air." Grace Han of Asian Movie Pulse rated the film as 4/5 and praised the cinematography writing "The camera gazes in awe upon the sheer force of urbanity in the Indian capital – and nature’s ability to adapt accordingly." Terming the film as portrait she wrote "All in all, All That Breathes illustrates a portrait of a delicate ecosystem that is dangerously upset." Han concluded, "As the future heads into uncertain territory, All That Breathes spells out a plea for balance. She further opined, "In this life, everything all that breathes is connected: under the skies, through the air, and the Earth upon which we live."
Bilge Ebiri reviewing for Spirituality & Health wrote, "Stunningly filmed, the film [is] as gorgeous as it is ambitious, as stirring as it is terrifying." Ending his review Ebiri opined, "And, given the perilous situation all the creatures depicted in this picture are in, one cannot help but wonder if it’s just a matter of time before we are all similarly threatened." Shubhra Gupta of The Indian Express covering the Cannes Film Festival, wrote, "Shaunak Sen’s terrific documentary was as much of a celebration [as Pakistan’s Joyland]."

Accolades

References

External links
 
 

2022 films
2022 documentary films
American documentary films
British documentary films
Indian documentary films
Sundance Film Festival award winners
Films shot in Delhi
2020s Hindi-language films
Documentary films about birds
Documentary films about environmental issues
2020s American films
2020s British films
Kites (birds)
-